Dendronotus venustus is a species of sea slug, a dendronotid nudibranch, a shell-less marine gastropod mollusc in the family Dendronotidae.

Distribution 
This species can be found on the Pacific coast of North America. It was formerly confused with the North Atlantic species Dendronotus frondosus.

Feeding habits

This species feeds on hydroids.

References

Dendronotidae
Gastropods described in 1966